Judith Rousseau is a Bayesian statistician who studies frequentist properties of Bayesian methods. She is a professor of statistics at the University of Oxford, a Fellow of Jesus College, Oxford, a Fellow of the Institute of Mathematical Statistics, and a Fellow of the International Society for Bayesian Analysis.

Education and career
Rousseau studied statistics and economics at ENSAE ParisTech, starting in pure mathematics but changing fields after taking a statistics class "because of all the interactions it has with other fields". She completed a doctorate in 1997 at Pierre and Marie Curie University. Her dissertation, Asymptotic properties of Bayes estimates, was supervised by Christian Robert.

She taught at Paris Descartes University from 1998 to 2004, Paris Dauphine University beginning in 2004, and (while on leave from Paris Dauphine) at ENSAE from 2009 to 2014. She joined Oxford in 2017.

Recognition
In 2015 Rousseau won the inaugural Ethel Newbold Prize of the Bernoulli Society for Mathematical Statistics and Probability.
The award recognizes a "recipient of any gender who is an outstanding statistical scientist for a body of work that represents excellence in research in mathematical statistics". The body of work for which Rousseau was recognized includes her work on infinite-dimensional variants of the Bernstein–von Mises theorem.

In 2019, she was awarded a European Research Council (ERC) Advance Grant for her project "General theory for Big Bayes".

References

Year of birth missing (living people)
Living people
French statisticians
Women statisticians
Pierre and Marie Curie University alumni
Academic staff of Paris Descartes University
Fellows of the Institute of Mathematical Statistics
Fellows of Jesus College, Oxford